Nikolai Nikolaevich Demidov (born November 16, 1985) is a Russian professional ice hockey defenceman who is currently playing for Zauralie Kurgan in the Supreme Hockey League (VHL).

On March 20, 2018, Demidov was signed to a two-year contract extension to remain with HC Sibir Novosibirsk through to 2020.

References

External links

1995 births
Living people
People from Odintsovsky District
Russian ice hockey defencemen
Severstal Cherepovets players
HC Sibir Novosibirsk players
Torpedo Nizhny Novgorod players
Yermak Angarsk players
Sportspeople from Moscow Oblast
Zauralie Kurgan players